The 2019–20 season is the 130th season of competitive football in the Netherlands.

League season

Eredivisie

Eerste Divisie

Tweede Divisie

Derde Divisie

Saturday League

Sunday League

Hoofdklasse

Saturday A League

Saturday B League

Sunday A League

Sunday B League

Eerste Klasse

Eredivisie (women)

References

 
Seasons in Dutch football
N
N